The 2019–20 Macedonian Football Cup was the 28th season of North Macedonia's football knockout competition. Akademija Pandev were the defending champions, having won their first title in the previous year.

On 4 June 2020, the Football Federation of Macedonia announced that the competition was abandoned due to the increasing number of COVID-19 cases in North Macedonia.

Competition calendar

First round
The draw was held on 9 August 2019. 

|-
|colspan="3" style="background-color:#97DEFF" align=center|19 August 2019
|-

|-
|colspan="3" style="background-color:#97DEFF" align=center|20 August 2019

|-
|colspan="3" style="background-color:#97DEFF" align=center|21 August 2019

|-
|colspan="3" style="background-color:#97DEFF" align=center|28 August 2019

|-
|colspan="3" style="background-color:#97DEFF" align=center|N/A

|}

Second round
The draw was held on 30 August 2019. The first legs were played on 25 September and the second legs were played on 30 October 2019.

|}

Quarter-finals 
The draw was held on 1 November 2019. first legs were played on 4 December 2019 and the second legs were played on 4 March 2020.

|}

Season statistics

Top scorers

See also 
 2019–20 Macedonian First Football League
 2019–20 Macedonian Second Football League

References

External links 
Football Federation of Macedonia 
MacedonianFootball.com 

North Macedonia
Cup
Macedonian Football Cup seasons
Macedonian Football Cup, 2019–20